David Buchanan (1823 – 4 April 1890) was a barrister and politician in colonial New South Wales, a member of the New South Wales Legislative Assembly and later, the New South Wales Legislative Council.

Buchanan was born in Edinburgh, Mid-Lothian, Scotland, the fifth son of William Buchanan, a barrister, and his wife Catherine, née Gregory. Buchanan was educated at the Edinburgh High School.

Buchanan emigrated to Australia in 1852, and was elected to the New South Wales Legislative Assembly as member for Morpeth on 14 December 1860. In 1862 he unsuccessfully sued the Sydney Morning Herald for libel and was required to pay their legal costs. He was drunk in August 1862 and was involved in an altercation with Samuel Terry. In the assembly Buchanan described Terry as a coward, eventually withdrawing the remark. Buchanan continued to interrupt and held to be in contempt of parliament. He refused to leave the chamber, was arrested by the Sergeant-at-arms and forcibly removed. He was unable to pay the legal costs of his failed libel suit and declared himself bankrupt and resigned from parliament. He re-contested the seat at the resulting by-election but was defeated.

He was returned to the Legislative Assembly as a representative of East Macquarie at a by-election in October 1864, serving  until 1 August 1867. He resigned in 1867 and went to England, entering at the Middle Temple in November of that year, being called to the bar in June 1869. He then returned to New South Wales, and practised his profession, being elected to the Legislative Assembly for East Sydney (3 December 1869 to 3 February 1872), and for  Goldfields West (25 March 1872 to 12 October 1877). Though defeated at 1879 Mudgee by-election, the election was overturned by the Committee of Elections and Qualifications and Buchanan was declared duly elected in March 1879, a seat he held until 7 October 1885. Buchanan represented Central Cumberland from 15 May 1888 to 19 January 1889.

As a politician Buchanan gained prominence by his sturdy championship of fiscal protection. He revisited England in 1886, and published a selection from his orations and speeches. Having unsuccessfully contested Balmain at the general election in January 1889, he was nominated to the Legislative Council  on 27 February 1889, a position he held until his death.

References

 

1832 births
1890 deaths
Members of the New South Wales Legislative Assembly
Members of the New South Wales Legislative Council
Politicians from Edinburgh
Scottish emigrants to colonial Australia
19th-century Australian politicians